John Lush may refer to:
 Johnny Lush, American baseball player
 John Lush (priest), Archdeacon of Southland
 John Alfred Lush, English politician
 Ginty Lush (John Grantley Lush), Australian cricketer